Albarigi (also transliterated as Albarigi, Barigi, or Barigi) is an Arabic family name denoting a member of Banu Bariq. When followed by a sun letter, the l in al assimilates to the initial consonant of the following noun, resulting in a doubled consonant.

People
Arfaja al-Bariqi, was a companion of Muhammad.
Urwah al-Bariqi, was a companion of Muhammad.
Suraqah al-Bariqi (died 698 CE), was a companion of Muhammad and  one of the greatest  Arabic poets.
Humaydah al-Bariqi, was a companion of Muhammad.
Hudhayfah al-Bariqi, was a companion of Muhammad.
 Mu'aqqir (died 580 CE),  He is considered one of the greatest writers of Arabic poetry in pre-Islamic (Jahiliyyah) times.
 Amr ibn Khalid (died 680 CE), was one of the Companions of Husayn ibn Ali, who was martyred along with him in the battle of Karbala.
 Asma bint Adiy al-Bariqiyyah (born 340 CE), Mother of Yaqaza father of Makhzum and Taym, father of Banu Taym.

Arabic-language surnames
Banu Bariq